This is a list of Kannada-language magazines.

India

References

See also 

 Media in Karnataka
 List of Kannada films
 List of Kannada newspapers
 List of Kannada radio stations
 List of Kannada television channels
 List of magazines in India

Kannada
Kannada
Kannada magazines